Gabriel Hernán Cela Ruggeri (born October 8, 1974 in Rosario (Santa Fe), Argentina) is a former Argentine footballer who played for clubs in Argentina, Bolivia, Chile and Italy.

Teams
  Central Córdoba (Rosario) 1996–1997
  Independiente 1997
  Deportes Concepción 1998
  Central Córdoba (Rosario) 1998–1999
  All Boys 1999–2000
  Cipolletti 2000–2001
  Viterbrese 2001
  Chacarita Juniors 2002–2003
  Central Córdoba (Rosario) 2003
  San José 2004
  Guillermo Brown 2004
  Juventud Antoniana 2004
  Barracas Central 2005–2006
  Arco Iris Virgen Misionera 2007
  Independiente de Neuquén 2007–2008

References
 Profile at BDFA
 Gabriel Hernán Cela at playmakerstats.com (English version of ceroacero.es)
 

1974 births
Living people
Argentine footballers
Argentine expatriate footballers
Central Córdoba de Rosario footballers
Club Atlético Independiente footballers
Deportes Concepción (Chile) footballers
Club Cipolletti footballers
All Boys footballers
Club San José players
Guillermo Brown footballers
Chilean Primera División players
Expatriate footballers in Chile
Expatriate footballers in Bolivia
Expatriate footballers in Italy
Association football forwards
Footballers from Rosario, Santa Fe